Platyptilia omissalis is a moth of the family Pterophoridae. The species was described by Thomas Bainbrigge Fletcher in 1926. It is found in Australia from southern Queensland to Victoria, south-western Australia and Tasmania.

Some authors consider it a synonym of Sinpunctiptilia emissalis.

Adults have a weak, almost hovering flight.

The larvae feed on the leaves of Parahebe species, including Parahebe perfoliata. At first, feeding results in a blotch mine on the upper surface of the leaf. Later, the larvae feed exposed on the upper surface of the leaf. The pupa is elongate, without a cocoon, and rests (fully exposed) on the vegetation attached to a silk pad by hooks at the rear end.

External links
Australian Faunal Directory
A Guide to Australian Moths
Moths of Australia
Australian Insects

Moths of Australia
omissalis
Endemic fauna of Australia
Moths described in 1926